Vladimir Yuryevich Sobolev (born 30 July 1991) is a Russian former footballer who played as a midfielder.

Club career
He made his Russian Premier League debut on 10 July 2010 for FC Saturn Ramenskoye in a game against PFC CSKA Moscow.

References

External links
 
 

1991 births
People from Gukovo
Living people
Russian footballers
Russia youth international footballers
Russia under-21 international footballers
Association football midfielders
Russian Premier League players
FC Saturn Ramenskoye players
FC Khimki players
FC Dynamo Moscow players
FC Anzhi Makhachkala players
FC Rubin Kazan players
FC Neftekhimik Nizhnekamsk players
Sportspeople from Rostov Oblast